Marshal of the Royal Air Force Neil Cameron, Baron Cameron of Balhousie,  (8 July 1920 – 29 January 1985) was a senior officer in the Royal Air Force. He fought in the Second World War as a fighter pilot taking part in the Battle of Britain, the Battle of Alam el Halfa, the First Battle of El Alamein and the Second Battle of El Alamein and then in operations in Burma. He served as Chief of the Air Staff in the late 1970s advising the British Government on the reinforcement of the British garrison in Belize which was under threat from Guatemala at the time. He also served as the Chief of the Defence Staff at the end of the 1970s in which role he secured pay comparability for services personnel involved in civil support during the firemen's strike, visited the People's Republic of China and lectured extensively on the Soviet air threat.

Early life
The only son and younger child of Neil Cameron (a retired company sergeant major in the Seaforth Highlanders) and his wife, Isabella Cameron (née Stewart), Cameron was brought up by his mother and grandfather in Perth, his father having died when he was three weeks old. Cameron attended the Northern District School and took up employment with the Commercial Bank of Scotland in the Fife town of Newburgh in 1937.

RAF career
Cameron joined the Royal Air Force Volunteer Reserve in May 1939 and started his flying training at No. 3 Initial Training Wing at Hastings. From March to September 1940 he completed his elementary pilot training, advanced training and operational training before being posted to No. 1 Squadron at RAF Wittering as a sergeant pilot flying Hurricanes. He was posted to No. 17 Squadron at RAF Martlesham Heath in October 1940 in time to take part in the final stages of the Battle of Britain.

Cameron joined No. 134 Squadron at Murmansk in northern Russia in July 1941 and was granted a commission with the war substantive rank of pilot officer on 31 July 1941. Off the coast of northern Russia he was required to take-off from a Royal Navy aircraft carrier without practice. Promoted to the war substantive rank of flying officer on 4 March 1942, he joined No. 213 Squadron, part of the Desert Air Force, in August 1942, and he was promoted to the war substantive rank of squadron leader on 4 March 1943. In this role he took part in the Battle of Alam el Halfa in September 1942, the First Battle of El Alamein in July 1942 and the Second Battle of El Alamein in October 1942.

Cameron went on to be an advisor to No. 335 (Hellenic) Squadron in April 1943 and, having been mentioned in despatches on 2 June 1943, he joined the Air Staff responsible for Fighter Operations at Headquarters No. 224 Group in October 1943. He became Officer Commanding No. 258 Squadron operating in Burma in February 1944 and was awarded the Distinguished Flying Cross on 21 November 1944 and the Distinguished Service Order on 2 October 1945.

Cameron transferred from the RAF Volunteer Reserve to the Royal Air Force after the War ended and was given a permanent commission as a flight lieutenant on 1 September 1945. He became an instructor at the School of Air Support at Old Sarum in October 1945 and went on to be RAF Liaison Officer at Headquarters Rhine Army in April 1948. He attended RAF Staff College in 1949 and later that year joined the Air Staff in the Directorate of Organisation at the Air Ministry.

Cameron was promoted to squadron leader on 1 January 1950 but spent much of that year and the next incapacitated because of a severe case of infective endocarditis. He was selected for Aircrew Selection Duties at the Air Ministry in January 1952 before joining the Directing Staff at the RAF Staff College in December 1953. Having been promoted to wing commander on 1 January 1956, but still recovering from illness, he became Officer Commanding the University of London Air Squadron in August 1956. He became Personal Staff Officer to the Chief of the Air Staff in November 1958, and having been promoted to group captain on 1 July 1960, he became Officer Commanding RAF Abingdon in November 1960. He attended Imperial Defence College in 1963 and became Principal Staff Officer to Deputy Supreme Allied Commander Europe at the end of the year.
 
Promoted to air commodore on 1 July 1964, Cameron joined the Staff at the RAF College Cranwell in February 1965 becoming Assistant Commandant there a few months later. He became RAF Member of Programme Evaluation Group in September 1966, and having been appointed Commander of the Order of the British Empire in the 1967 Birthday Honours, he became Assistant Chief of Defence Staff in February 1968. Promoted to air vice marshal on 1 July 1968, he became Senior Air Staff Officer at Headquarters Air Support Command in September 1970.

Appointed Companion of the Order of the Bath in the 1971 New Year Honours, Cameron became Deputy Commander RAF Germany in December 1972 and Air Officer Commanding No. 46 Group in December 1973. Then, having been promoted to air marshal on 1 July 1974, he became Air Member for Personnel in October 1974. He was advanced to Knight Commander of the Order of the Bath in the 1975 New Year Honours. He was promoted to air chief marshal on 1 November 1975 and advanced to Knight Grand Cross of the Order of the Bath in the 1976 Birthday Honours.

Cameron was appointed Air Aide-de-Camp to the Queen on 6 August 1976 and Chief of the Air Staff on 7 August 1976. As Chief of the Air Staff he advised the British Government on the reinforcement of the British garrison in Belize which was under threat from Guatemala at the time. Having been promoted to Marshal of the Royal Air Force on 31 July 1977, Cameron became Chief of the Defence Staff on 31 August 1977. In that role he secured pay comparability for services personnel involved in civil support during the firemen's strike, visited the People's Republic of China and lectured extensively on the Soviet air threat. He retired in August 1979.

Later life
In retirement Cameron became Principal of King's College London who also awarded him an honorary LLD. On 14 March 1983 he was created a life peer as Baron Cameron of Balhousie, of Balhousie in the District of Perth and Kinross. He was appointed a Knight of the Order of the Thistle on 30 November 1983. He also became Chairman of the trustees of the RAF Museum. He died of cancer at the Middlesex Hospital in London on 29 January 1985.

Personal life
In 1947 he married Patricia Louise Asprey; they had a son and a daughter. His interests included rugby.

References

Sources

 

|-
 

|-

1920 births
1985 deaths
Marshals of the Royal Air Force
Chiefs of the Air Staff (United Kingdom)
Knights of the Thistle
Knights Grand Cross of the Order of the Bath
Crossbench life peers
Commanders of the Order of the British Empire
Companions of the Distinguished Service Order
Recipients of the Distinguished Flying Cross (United Kingdom)
Royal Air Force pilots of World War II
Principals of King's College London
Military personnel from Perth, Scotland
Scottish airmen
The Few
People educated at Perth Academy
Chiefs of the Defence Staff (United Kingdom)
Deaths from cancer in England
Graduates of the Royal College of Defence Studies
Royal Air Force Volunteer Reserve personnel of World War II
British World War II fighter pilots
Life peers created by Elizabeth II